Joaquim Espalter i Rull or, in Spanish, Joaquín Espalter y Rull (30 September 1809 – 16 January 1880) was a Catalan painter who spent most of his career in Madrid; known primarily for portraits and historical scenes.

Biography

He was born in Sitges to a merchant family from Barcelona, who were living in Sitges temporarily as a result of the Peninsular War. When they returned home, he studied at a Piarist school, following which he was sent to Montpellier for a year to study business. Between 1823 and 1828, having decided to devote himself to painting, he lived in Barcelona and attended the Escola de la Llotja.<ref>Caso, E.F., Les Orientalistes de l'école Espagnole, ACR edition, 1997, p. 82</ref>

After a brief stay at the École des Beaux-Arts in Marseille, he moved to Paris in 1829 and studied with Antoine-Jean Gros, then established himself in Rome in 1833, where he became part of a group of Catalan painters associated with the Nazarene movement, which included Claudi Lorenzale and Pelegrí Clavé. He was a great admirer of Fra Angelico and Giotto and made several visits to Tuscany. In 1839, he presented several works at a major exhibition in Florence.

In 1842, he settled in Madrid and was named an Academician at the Real Academia de Bellas Artes de San Fernando. In 1847, together with Federico de Madrazo and the writer Eugenio de Ochoa, he founded a short-lived artistic journal called El Renacimiento (The Renaissance). Later, he was named an honorary court painter by Queen Isabel II and, in 1860, a Professor of Drawing at the "Escuela Superior de Pintura, Escultura y Grabado".

He had a showing at the Exposition Universelle (1855) and became a regular participant in the National Exhibition of Fine Arts after 1870; occasionally serving on the jury. In 1872, he was awarded the Grand Cross of the Order of Isabella the Catholic.

Although he painted in a variety of genres, he became known as a portraitist and was very popular with the local bourgeoisie for his simple, direct style. In addition to his portraits, he also created decorations for the Teatro Español (1848) and painted murals for the Universidad Central (1853-1858) and the Palacio de Congreso de Diputados.

He died in Madrid, aged 70.

 References 

Further reading
 Carlos G. Navarro "Joaquin Espalter en Italia: A propósito de las aguadas y pinturas del Museo del Prado", In: España y Alemania : Intercambio cultural en el siglo XIX, Karin Hellwig (Ed.), Iberoamericana, 2007  pp. 145–174
 Antoni Vigó i Marcé, Joaquim Espalter i Rull: en el centenari de la seva mort'', Grup d'Estudis Sitgetans, 1980 (Online)

External links

1809 births
1880 deaths
Spanish male painters
19th-century Catalan painters
History painters
Orientalist painters
People from Sitges
Recipients of the Order of Isabella the Catholic
Spanish portrait painters